Chahar Bisheh may refer to various places in Iran:
 Chahar Bisheh, Fars
 Chahar Bisheh, Izeh, Khuzestan Province
 Chahar Bisheh, Masjed Soleyman, Khuzestan Province
 Chahar Bisheh-ye Olya, Kohgiluyeh and Boyer-Ahmad Province
 Chahar Bisheh-ye Sofla, Kohgiluyeh and Boyer-Ahmad Province
 Chahar Bisheh District Poultry Facility, Kohgiluyeh and Boyer-Ahmad Province
 Chahar Bisheh Industrial Estate, Kohgiluyeh and Boyer-Ahmad Province